Oakdale is a city in the San Joaquin Valley and Stanislaus County, California. It is part of the Modesto Metropolitan Statistical Area.

Oakdale goes by the slogan "Cowboy Capital of the World."  The population was 23,181 at the 2020 census, up from 20,675 at the 2010 census and 15,503 at the 2000 census.

History
The city was founded in 1871 when the Stockton and Visalia Railroad met the Copperopolis Railroad.   The site of Taylor's Ferry Crossing is located in Oakdale, a crossing of the Stanislaus River on the 19th century Stockton - Los Angeles Road.

Oakdale was used as a film location for the United Artists film Bound For Glory starring David Carradine. Oakdale doubled as a dusty 'Texas' town using railroad scenes for the film. Oakdale was nominated for an award for having the most almond trees per capita per square mile in the state of California.

Geography
The city is located on the Stanislaus River in the east-central portion of the San Joaquin Valley, adjacent to the foothills of the Sierra Nevada.  California State Routes 108 and 120 (Tioga Pass Road) intersect in the city.

The National Weather Service has maintained a cooperative weather station at Woodward Dam for many years.

There are an average of 44 days annually with measurable precipitation.

Demographics

2010
At the 2010 census Oakdale had a population of 20,675. The racial makeup of Oakdale was 16,558 (80.1%) White, 163 (0.8%) African American, 210 (1.0%) Native American, 463 (2.2%) Asian, 37 (0.2%) Pacific Islander, 2,386 (11.5%) from other races, and 858 (4.1%) from two or more races. Hispanic or Latino of any race were 5,398 persons (26.1%).

The census reported that 20,488 people (99.1% of the population) lived in households, 75 (0.4%) lived in non-institutionalized group quarters, and 112 (0.5%) were institutionalized.

There were 7,288 households, 3,016 (41.4%) had children under the age of 18 living in them, 3,853 (52.9%) were opposite-sex married couples living together, 1,009 (13.8%) had a female householder with no husband present, 436 (6.0%) had a male householder with no wife present.  There were 517 (7.1%) unmarried opposite-sex partnerships, and 36 (0.5%) same-sex married couples or partnerships. 1,573 households (21.6%) were one person and 694 (9.5%) had someone living alone who was 65 or older. The average household size was 2.81.  There were 5,298 families (72.7% of households); the average family size was 3.28.

The age distribution was 5,766 people (27.9%) under the age of 18, 1,837 people (8.9%) aged 18 to 24, 5,436 people (26.3%) aged 25 to 44, 5,083 people (24.6%) aged 45 to 64, and 2,553 people (12.3%) who were 65 or older.  The median age was 34.9 years. For every 100 females, there were 95.4 males.  For every 100 females age 18 and over, there were 90.8 males.

There were 7,822 housing units at an average density of 1,283.5 per square mile, of the occupied units 4,454 (61.1%) were owner-occupied and 2,834 (38.9%) were rented. The homeowner vacancy rate was 2.7%; the rental vacancy rate was 7.7%.  12,342 people (59.7% of the population) lived in owner-occupied housing units and 8,146 people (39.4%) lived in rental housing units.

2000
At the 2000 census, there were 15,503 people in 5,610 households, including 4,050 families, in the city. The racial makeup of the city was 83.82% White, 5.48% African American, 1.09% Native American, 1.18% Asian, 0.12% Pacific Islander, 9.27% from other races, and 4.04% from two or more races.

Of the 5,610 households 37.9% had children under the age of 18 living with them, 52.8% were married couples living together, 14.2% had a female householder with no husband present, and 27.8% were non-families. 22.9% of households were one person and 9.9% were one person aged 65 or older.  The average household size was 2.73 and the average family size was 3.20.

The age distribution was 28.9% under the age of 18, 8.9% from 18 to 24, 29.1% from 25 to 44, 20.2% from 45 to 64, and 12.8% 65 or older. The median age was 34 years. For every 100 females, there were 92.1 males.  For every 100 females age 18 and over, there were 87.0 males.

The median household income was $39,338 and the median family income  was $44,024. Males had a median income of $40,494 versus $24,747 for females. The per capita income for the city was $17,019.  About 8.6% of families and 11.3% of the population were below the poverty line, including 14.0% of those under age 18 and 9.8% of those age 65 or over.

Environment

Soil characteristics
Historically the area has been used for orchards and other agricultural uses. Some of the common soil types found in Oakdale are Delhi sand, Oakdale sandy loam, Hanford sandy loam, and Tujunga loamy sand. Drainage is generally to the northwest towards the Stanislaus River.

Contamination
There have been several local releases of toxic chemicals that have resulted in soil contamination and aquifer water contamination. Examples of these releases are:

 Beacon Service Station, 1590 East F Street, Oakdale. This release was a fuel leak caused by an underground tank failure in 1985.  Approximately 2,000 gallons of product was released into the environment. The groundwater has been contaminated with reported benzene concentrations as high as 1790 parts per billion. Soil remediation began as early as 1989.
 Chevron Service Station, 346 East F Street, Oakdale. An unknown quantity of gasoline was released. The release was discovered on May 25, 1987, through a site inspection. Groundwater is contaminated and cleanup work ensued.
 Cruse Brothers, 663 South Yosemite Avenue, Oakdale. Diesel fuel contamination was discovered on November 11, 1988, during the removal of a 30-year-old steel 500-gallon tank. The Central Valley Regional Water Quality Control Board sent an Enforcement Action Letter on January 23, 1989.

Government
Cherilyn Bairos was elected mayor in 2021.

Economy
The Oakdale economy centers on agriculture, food manufacturing, and tourism.

Oakdale was the home to the Oakdale Hershey Plant, a satellite plant of Hershey Chocolate, that closed in January 2008 and moved to Mexico.  It opened in May 1965, operated the Hershey's Oakdale Visitor Center and Shop in town, and employed about 575 local people. The plant was purchased by Sconza Candy Company, which began production in October 2008.

Many other large food manufacturing operations are nearby including a ConAgra Foods Hunt's plant which is one of the largest tomato processing plants in the world.  Cattle ranching is common in the surrounding areas, adding to the diversity and character of the local economy.

Education

Oakdale has a high school, a junior high school and four elementary schools.  Together they comprise the Oakdale Joint Unified School District.
 Oakdale High School; mascot is the mustang.
 Oakdale Junior High School; mascot is the ram.
 Cloverland Elementary School; mascot is the cougar.
 Fair Oaks Elementary School: mascot is the falcon.
 Magnolia Elementary School: mascot is the bear.
 Sierra View Elementary School; mascot is the coyote.

Notable people

 Bruce Coslet - professional football player and coach, born in Oakdale and attended Oakdale High School, winning 16 varsity letters before graduating and playing at University of the Pacific.
 Eddie LeBaron - College Football Hall of Fame member, attended Oakdale High School.
 Eric Medlen -  NHRA Fuel Funny Car driver, attended Oakdale High School and was raised in Oakdale.
Brett Dennen - Musician

Attractions
The Oakdale Cowboy Museum focuses on the area's ranchers and rodeo cowboys and cowgirls.  Exhibits include historic photographs, saddles, rodeo artifacts, and cowboy gear.

The Oakdale Museum is located in the oldest home in Oakdale and focuses on the families and businesses of the area. Exhibits include historic photographs, furniture, home goods, clothing, yearbooks, and more. The museum is also a research center for people interested in finding out about family from the area.

The Oakdale Cheese & Specialties is owned and operated by Dutch immigrants Walter and Lenneke Bulk. Cheesemaking has been in Walter's family for 4 generations. They specialize in Gouda and offer a variety of choices.

The Stanislaus River offers areas for rafting, kayaking, swimming, fishing, camping and hiking.

The Sierra DinnerTrain is located just south of the main intersection (Yosemite & F). Operating on the 3rd oldest rail line in North America, Sierra Railroad, the train has been featured in dozens of film productions. Sierra DinnerTrain meanders through open-countryside and offers a unique, year-round venue for dining and family excursions.

References

External links
 
 Oakdale Tourism & Visitors Bureau
 Oakdale Chamber of Commerce
 

 
Cities in Stanislaus County, California
Geography of the San Joaquin Valley
Incorporated cities and towns in California
Stanislaus River
Populated places established in 1871
1871 establishments in California